Thomas of York (b. c. 1220; d. before 1269) was an English Franciscan theologian and scholastic philosopher of the thirteenth century.  He was associated with the Oxford Franciscan school.

He entered the Order of Friars Minor in 1242, and studied at the University of Oxford. He later was the leader of the Franciscan establishment at Cambridge.
Along with Bonaventure and Thomas Aquinas, he was a major critic of the Parisian secular theologian William of Saint-Amour.

Works 
 Thomae Eboracensis, Sapientiale, Liber III, cap. 1-20, edited by Antonio Punzi, Florence, SISMEL, 2000.

Notes

External links
Franaut entry: Thomas de York (Eboracensis, d. ca. 1260)
Jeremy Catto, ‘York, Thomas of (b. c.1220, d. before 1269)’, rev., Oxford Dictionary of National Biography, Oxford University Press, 2004, accessed 20 June 2007

English theologians
English Friars Minor
Scholastic philosophers
13th-century births
13th-century deaths
English philosophers
13th-century philosophers